There Is Only You is the third album from alternative rock band The Xcerts released on 3 November 2014 through Raygun Music.

There Is Only You reached number 96 in the UK album chart in its first week of release and number 8 in the Rock album chart.

Track listing

Personnel
 Murray Macleod – guitar, vocals
 Jordan Smith – bass guitar, vocals, piano
 Tom Heron – drums, percussion, vocals

References

2014 albums
The Xcerts albums
Albums produced by Dave Eringa